The Protecteur class (formerly known as the Queenston class) of naval auxiliaries for the Royal Canadian Navy (RCN) began as the Joint Support Ship Project, a Government of Canada procurement project for the RCN that is part of the National Shipbuilding Procurement Strategy. It will see the RCN acquire two multi-role vessels to replace the earlier  auxiliary oiler replenishment vessels that were operated by the RCN.

The project has suffered from considerable delays. Originally announced in 2004, a contract for the construction of these ships was to have been signed in 2009, which would have seen the first vessel available for operational service in 2012. In 2010 the federal government grouped the Joint Support Ship Project under the National Shipbuilding Procurement Strategy, which was finalized in October 2011. While initial construction work on modules for the lead vessel began in 2018, a formal contract for the construction of both ships was only signed in June 2020.

On 2 June 2013, ThyssenKrupp Marine Systems Canada's  replenishment ship was selected as the basis for the design of the Joint Support Ship Project. The Canadian vessels will be a variant of the Berlin class, as the design had to be optimized for Seaspan's yard in North Vancouver, British Columbia.

Class name
On 25 October 2013, the Minister of National Defence named the JSS the Queenston class with two ships named, HMCS Queenston and Châteauguay.  Their namesakes were to be battles of the War of 1812, Queenston Heights and Châteauguay. A name was also chosen for a possible third ship in the class, HMCS Crysler's Farm, named after the Battle of Crysler's Farm. The option for the third vessel was dropped due to budget constraints. On 12 September 2017, the Canadian government renamed the class and vessels, taking the names of the ships of the class that they are to replace. Queenston became Protecteur and Châteauguay became Preserver. According to Vice-Admiral Ron Lloyd, commander of the RCN, this was due to the ties both serving and former navy personnel had with the names.

Purpose
The Joint Support Ship Project consists of two multi-role vessels that will replace the former underway replenishment capability of the earlier Protecteur-class auxiliary vessel, as well as provide basic sealift for the Canadian Army, support to forces ashore, and command facilities for a Canadian Forces "joint force" or "naval task group".

The Joint Support Ship Project should not be confused with the Amphibious Assault Ship Project, which is a proposed separate procurement project but one which has never advanced beyond a conception stage.

Proposed ship capabilities
, the Joint Support Ship Project envisioned several multi-role vessels capable of supporting the Royal Canadian Navy's warships at sea, as well as providing strategic sealift and some airlift for naval task groups or army operations. The vessels were envisaged as having a multi-purpose covered deck with the ability to carry up to 10,000 tonnes of ship fuel, 1,300 tonnes of aviation fuel, 1,100 tonnes of ammunition as well as 1,000–1,500 lane metres of deck space for carrying vehicles and containerized cargo. The vessels were also to have hospital facilities as well as a large helicopter deck with two landing spots, hangar space for four helicopters, and a roll-on/roll-off deck for vehicles onto a dock. The actual capabilities have been listed as being able to carry 64 twenty-foot equivalent units of shipping containers, which can be used to store food, water, vehicles, and other specialized equipment to support land or sea-based operations, including humanitarian aid or disaster relief. Additionally, these containers can house special mission fit cargo, such as mobile hospitals and portable communication centers, which could be offloaded or airlifted ashore. hold up to 6,875 tons of F76 marine fuel, 1,037 tons of F44 aviation fuel, an on board hospital with surgical and dental facilities.

Particulars of the Berlin-class design
The Berlin-class design ultimately selected by the RCN in 2013 incorporated somewhat modified components:

 Ability to transport  of fuel,  of water,  of ammunition,  of food,  of dry stores and 32 containers.
 Ship fitted with replenishment-at-sea (RAS) systems and accommodates up to two helicopters. The loading and offloading of cargo is carried out by two 24-ton cranes.
 The modular hospital of the Berlin class has 45 beds for general patients and four for intensive care (including hospital ward).

The Canadian variant of the Berlin class may incorporate additional modifications from the original design.

Survivability
 Self-defence active and passive
 Damaged stability enhanced two-compartment
 Degaussing, Nixie torpedo decoy, protection against chemical, biological, radiological and nuclear threats, close-in weapons systems and naval remote weapon system.

Airlift
 Two CH-148 Cyclone helicopters
 Enclosed hangar with maintenance and repair facilities

Vessels will be designed with double hulls for storage of petroleum products, unlike the former Protecteur-class single-hull vessels.

Joint headquarters support
 Naval communications
 Land communications
 Air communications

Project timeline
In 2004 the federal government commenced the Joint Support Ship Project. Originally, there were four syndicates vying for the contract, led by Irving Shipbuilding, BAE Systems, ThyssenKrupp Marine Systems Canada, and SNC-Lavalin ProFac.  Two design finalists were selected in November 2006: ThyssenKrupp and SNC-Lavalin ProFac. Under the two remaining proposals, the ships will be built in either Marystown, Newfoundland or North Vancouver, British Columbia, respectively. A contract for final design and construction was expected in 2008, with the first ship of the class entering service in 2012. In January 2007, Canadian media reported that defence planners were considering the retirement of the existing Protecteur-class ships by 2010, prior to the delivery of the first replacement vessels in 2012. This news was met with criticism as it would leave MARCOM without an underway replenishment capability for two years.

On 22 August 2008 the Minister of Public Works and Government Services, Christian Paradis terminated two procurement processes involving the shipbuilding industry.  In December 2008 MARCOM officers and defence analysts had been hoping that January's federal budget would have contained up to $500 million in extra funding for the Joint Support Ship Project so that it could be completed. In the same month Defence Minister Peter MacKay suggested that the budget stimulus package would deal with MARCOM's shipbuilding needs. However, there was no extra money for the Joint Support Ship Project and the stimulus package did not address MARCOM's vessel procurement programs. Vice-Admiral Denis Rouleau, spoke to the Standing Committee on National Defence in the House of Commons and indicated that the Department of National Defence would know by summer 2009 how it would move ahead with the Joint Support Ship Project.

In June 2009 officials with the Joint Support Ship Project began re-evaluating the type of ship they wished to purchase since the original concept could not be met with the money the government was willing to provide. One option would be to start from scratch and purchase a different type of ship altogether. In September 2009, the Joint Support Ship Project received a new design. Vice-Admiral Dean McFadden, Chief of the Maritime Staff, said that he was ready to submit design and cost estimates to the government and to the Minister of National Defence.

In June 2010 the Government of Canada announced that the National Shipbuilding Procurement Strategy (NSPS) would see $35 billion spent over the next 30 years to purchase 28 new large ships and 116 small vessels for Maritime Command and the Canadian Coast Guard. The NSPS was headed by the government's procurement arm, the Department of Public Works and Government Services, with support from Department of Industry, as well as the 2 departments responsible for MARCOM and CCG, the Department of National Defence and Department of Fisheries and Oceans respectively. In July 2010, Defence Minister Peter MacKay announced that under the NSPS the federal government would initially purchase two joint support ships (at a cost of $2.6 billion) with options for a third. On 11 October 2010 the Government of Canada invited five shipbuilding companies "to participate in a request for proposals" for the NSPS.

On 19 October 2011, the Government of Canada announced the results of the competitive evaluation of bids in the NSPS which saw the $8 billion non-combat ship package, including the Joint Support Ship Project, awarded to Seaspan Marine Corporation in Vancouver, British Columbia.

On 2 June 2013, the Government of Canada selected ThyssenKrupp Marine Systems Canada's Berlin-class AOR as the design for the Joint Support Ship. On 11 October 2013,  The NSPS Secretariat announced that Vancouver Shipyards would commence construction on the Joint Support Ships, followed by the Polar Icebreaker, under the NSPS non-combat package. It was expected that construction would begin in 2016–17. On 25 October 2013, the Government of Canada named the two ships HMCS Queenston and HMCS Châteauguay in recognition of the significant battles of Queenston Heights and Châteauguay during the War of 1812. The class would have been named the Queenston class. However, these names were changed to Protecteur and Preserver respectively on 12 September 2017.

In August 2015 Davie Shipyard signed a contract to convert the container ship  for the role until the specialized ships were delivered. The contract is known as Project Resolve. The vessel was built in 2010 in Germany and will be converted for use by the RCN until the JSS are ready. Construction of the first JSS had been scheduled to begin at the Seaspan Yard in late 2017, following the construction of two other classes of ships for the Canadian Coast Guard.

In 2020, project costs had escalated significantly with an estimated $4.1 billion being required to complete the project. In 2022 delivery of the first ship was delayed until 2025, followed by the second ship in 2027. Even this delivery schedule was uncertain and the entire project budget was again under "review".

Construction
The first of class, Protecteur, is scheduled for a 2025 delivery. Preserver is expected to follow in 2027, though the dates for the operational service entry of both ships remain "under review". Given delays and in an effort to try to speed up the process of building the ships, steel was cut for the ships in 2018 during a lull in the construction of two Canadian Coast Guard science vessels at the yard. On 5 February 2019, it was announced that the construction of the first vessel in the class would be advanced and the ship would be completed at the Seaspan yard ahead of the construction of the planned Offshore Oceanographic Science Vessel (OOSV) for the Canadian Coast Guard. The second vessel would be completed only after the OOSV entered service. The first ship, Protecteur, was formally laid down on 16 January 2020. The formal contract for the construction of both ships was awarded in June 2020.

In March 2021 the Seaspan shipyard reported that over 90 percent of the ship blocks for Protecteur were in production. As of December 2021, the assembly of the ship was reported to be complete. Near the end of August 2022, construction was halted by a strike by Seaspan tugboat workers, as the shipyard staff will not cross the picket lines that have been set up.

Ships of class

See also
 Project Resolve
 Arctic Patrol Ship Project
 Amphibious Assault Ship Project
 Almirante Montt – Chilean supply vessel rented by the RCN to use on the Pacific Coast for 40 sea days each year from 2015 to 2017.

References

External links
 Article from the Canadian American Strategic Review

Proposed ships of the Royal Canadian Navy
Canadian defence procurement